Elections to Dungannon District Council were held on 15 May 1985 on the same day as the other Northern Irish local government elections. The election used four district electoral areas to elect a total of 22 councillors.

Election results

Note: "Votes" are the first preference votes.

Districts summary

|- class="unsortable" align="centre"
!rowspan=2 align="left"|Ward
! % 
!Cllrs
! % 
!Cllrs
! %
!Cllrs
! %
!Cllrs
! % 
!Cllrs
!rowspan=2|TotalCllrs
|- class="unsortable" align="center"
!colspan=2 bgcolor="" | UUP
!colspan=2 bgcolor="" | SDLP
!colspan=2 bgcolor="" | Sinn Féin
!colspan=2 bgcolor="" | DUP
!colspan=2 bgcolor="white"| Others
|-
|align="left"|Blackwater
|bgcolor="40BFF5"|44.1
|bgcolor="40BFF5"|3
|14.6
|1
|13.8
|0
|27.5
|1
|0.0
|0
|5
|-
|align="left"|Clogher Valley
|bgcolor="40BFF5"|31.7
|bgcolor="40BFF5"|2
|27.1
|1
|21.0
|1
|20.2
|1
|0.0
|0
|5
|-
|align="left"|Dungannon Town
|bgcolor="40BFF5"|37.0
|bgcolor="40BFF5"|2
|10.4
|1
|18.8
|0
|18.0
|1
|15.8
|1
|6
|-
|align="left"|Torrent
|17.3
|1
|17.9
|2
|bgcolor="#008800"|36.6
|bgcolor="#008800"|2
|4.5
|0
|23.7
|1
|6
|- class="unsortable" class="sortbottom" style="background:#C9C9C9"
|align="left"| Total
|32.1
|8
|17.6
|5
|22.9
|4
|17.2
|3
|10.2
|2
|22
|-
|}

District results

Blackwater

1985: 3 x UUP, 1 x DUP, 1 x SDLP

Clogher Valley

1985: 2 x UUP, 1 x SDLP, 1 x Sinn Féin, 1 x DUP

Dungannon Town

1985: 2 x UUP, 1 x Sinn Féin, 1 x DUP, 1 x SDLP, 1 x Independent Nationalist

Torrent

1985: 2 x Sinn Féin, 2 x SDLP, 1 x UUP, 1 x Independent Nationalist

References

Dungannon and South Tyrone Borough Council elections
Dungannon and South Tyrone